Metagonimus takahashii is a species of a trematode, or fluke worm, in the family Heterophyidae.

It is a human parasite causing metagonimiasis.

Distribution
This species occurs in Japan and Korea.

Life cycle
The first intermediate hosts of Metagonimus takahashii include freshwater snails Semisulcospira coreana and Koreanomelania nodifila.

The second intermediate host include freshwater fish: crucian carp Carassius carassius, common carp Cyprinus carpio, and Tribolodon brandtii.

Natural definitive hosts are humans. Experimental definitive hosts are: mice, and dogs.

References

External links

 

Heterophyidae
Animals described in 1929